Lachlan Lam (born 25 March 1998) is a Papua New Guinea international rugby league footballer who plays as a  and  for the Leigh Leopards in the Super League.

He previously played for the Sydney Roosters in the National Rugby League.

Early life 
Lam was born and raised in Sydney, New South Wales, Australia. He is of Papua New Guinean, Chinese and English descent through his father Adrian, a former professional rugby league player who represented  and Queensland.

Lam grew up playing junior rugby league for the Clovelly Crocodiles and attended Marcellin College.

When his father played for the Wigan Warriors, Lam played as a junior for Wigan St Patricks.

Playing career
Lam has been in the Sydney Roosters' youth system since he was 13, playing for their Harold Matthews Cup and S. G. Ball Cup teams. In 2014, Lam became the first player to utilise the 'father-son rule' introduced a year prior when he was selected to represent the Queensland under-16s team.

Having made his NYC debut in 2016, Lam was the first choice  for the Roosters in 2017. In October, he was named in Papua New Guinea's squad for the 2017 World Cup. Lam made his Test debut against the United States on 12 November, becoming Kumul #283.

In Round 2 of the 2019 season, Lam made his first grade debut for the Sydney Roosters against Manly-Warringah at Brookvale Oval.  On 7 April 2019, Lam scored a hat-trick for the North Sydney Bears against the Canterbury-Bankstown Bulldogs in a 42-0 victory at North Sydney Oval.

On 30 September 2019, Lam was named in the Papua New Guinea team for the Downer World Cup 9s.

He made seven appearances for the Sydney Roosters in the 2020 NRL season as the club fell short of a third successive premiership.  Lam played a total of 20 games for the Sydney Roosters in the 2021 NRL season including the club's two finals matches.  The Sydney Roosters would be eliminated from the second week of the finals losing to Manly 42-6.

On 21 July 2022, Lam signed a two-year deal to join RFL Championship side Leigh until the end of 2023. 
Lam scored a try on debut for Leigh against Featherstone Rovers and setup one for team-mate Joe Wardle at the 2022 Summer Bash in Leeds.
On 3 October 2022, Lam played for Leigh in their Million Pound Game victory over Batley which saw the club promoted back to the Super League.

References

External links
Sydney Roosters profile
2017 RLWC profile

1998 births
Living people
Australian people of Papua New Guinean descent
Australian people of Chinese descent
Australian people of English descent
Australian rugby league players
Leigh Leopards players
Papua New Guinea national rugby league team players
Rugby league five-eighths
Rugby league players from Sydney
Sydney Roosters players
North Sydney Bears NSW Cup players